Palo Verde Unified School District is a public school district in Riverside County, California, United States.

Schools
The public school district's 6 schools are

Elementary (K-5)
 Felix J. Appleby Elementary - opened 2000s, replaced earlier site.
 Margaret White Elementary - opened 1990s/2000s.
 Ruth Brown (formerly Central) Elementary - district's oldest - (special studies).

Middle
 Blythe Middle School (merged with Palo Verde High School, opened in 1930s).

High
 Palo Verde High School (Blythe, California)
 Twin Palms High School (continuation)

References

External links
 

School districts in Riverside County, California